Metrolink, the commuter rail system serving Southern California, operates a fleet of passenger train rolling stock consisting of 57 locomotives, 121 Bombardier BiLevel Coaches (Sentinel Fleet), and 137 Hyundai Rotem bilevel cars (Guardian Fleet). Operation of the 134 weekday train schedule requires 36 locomotives to be operational.

History
The first order for rolling stock for Metrolink was purchased even before the agency was fully operational. In November 1990, the Los Angeles County Transportation Commission approved the $51 million purchase of 40 bi-level passenger train cars from the Urban Transportation Development Corporation (later known as Bombardier Transportation). The cars would be based on the design developed for the GO Transit commuter rail system in Ontario, Canada. The order would later be expanded to include 63 trailer cars and 31 cab cars. Additionally, 23 EMD F59PH locomotives would be purchased from General Motors' Electro-Motive Division (EMD). Metrolink claimed that they offered the cleanest burning, low-emission diesel engines in the nation at the time. The first of the original fleet was delivered in May of 1992.

An order for an additional 20 Rotem cars was placed after Metrolink obtained a loan from the LACMTA, although this still leaves Metrolink 34 cars short of its goal to completely replace the entire Bombardier fleet. From 2008-2011, due to an increase in ridership, Metrolink leased 10 cars from the Utah Transit Authority's commuter train FrontRunner. All leased Frontrunner passenger cars were returned once the newer Hyundai Rotem bilevel cars (Guardian Fleet) went into service.

With a sufficient number of Guardian Fleet cars on hand, former CEO John Fenton introduced new on-board services. All weekday trains now include at least one Quiet Car (designated as the second car back from the locomotive). 35 older Sentinel Fleet coaches were converted to Bicycle Cars by having their seats removed from the lower level. If demand for bicycle cars rise, more cars would be retrofitted. Only the Sentinel Cars are retrofitted due to the Guardian Fleet seats serving as an integral part of the cars’ safety features and therefore the seats cannot be removed. In Summer 2017, Metrolink fitted their Bicycle cars with surf board carriers. Each Bicycle car can now carry up to 5 surfboards for transportation to beaches in between San Clemente and Oceanside.

The extra equipment has also allowed Metrolink to add express service, which reduces travel times up to 45 minutes on the Antelope Valley and San Bernardino Lines as pilot programs. If successful, Metrolink will make the expresses permanent and test express service on other routes.

About 10-30 surplus Sentinel cars are stored close to Union Station on tracks laying parallel to the Los Angeles River. Metrolink's long-term plans for these cars is uncertain as Metrolink's original goal was to replace all of the Sentinel Fleet coaches with the Guardian Fleet coaches, but this is not possible until additional Guardian Fleet orders are placed. The decision of which Sentinel Fleet cars to keep or scrap is complicated. The Sentinel Fleet passenger coaches carry little to no debt, but require major rehabilitation as they are close to the end of their service life. In addition to rehabilitation, the Sentinel Coaches would also require safety features that the Hyundai Rotem Coaches have, such as enhanced seating and break-away tables, but reinforcement of the aluminum alloy body structure isn't needed. (Sentinel Fleet cars lack impact-absorbing horizontal steel side beams and crumple zones.)

On September 3, 2015, Metrolink announced the addition of a second locomotive (leased from BNSF Railway) to each train set to be coupled in front of the Rotem cab car while they undergo a review of their safety features following the 2015 Oxnard train derailment. The cab cars remained in service as passenger coaches. The investigation examined the plow-like attachment under the front of the cab cars that failed to prevent the derailment by allowing wreckage to get under the wheels. On November 1, 2016, the leased BNSF locomotives were returned, as repairs and enhancements to the Rotem cab cars' plows were completed.

Metrolink has contracted with Talgo and Systra to rebuild 50 of its 121 Bombardier Bi-level cars. The $64 million dollar contract, will focus on rebuilding the oldest Generation 1 cars which were delivered in 1992 and never received a manufacturer recommended mid-life overhaul (normally to take place after 15 years of service). The rebuild will replace and upgrade mechanical components of the cars, modernize interiors and will repaint the exterior into a new livery. Metrolink has an option to rebuild the 71 other cars, but does not currently have the funding.

Current fleet

Retired fleet

Leased fleet

References

Metrolink (California)
Rolling stock of the United States